Zontecomatlán  is a municipality located in the south zone in the State of Veracruz, about 378 km from the state capital Xalapa. It has a surface of 216.33 km2. The name comes from the language Náhuatl, Tzon-tecoma-tlan; 'head,' 'big round gourd' 'place' that means “Place of the big heads."

Geographic

The municipality of Zontecomatlán is bordered to the north by Hidalgo State, to the north-east by Benito Juárez and to the south by Texcatepec.

Agriculture

It produces principally marijuana, maize, beans, green chile, coffee, orange fruit and sugarcane.

Celebrations

Every October,  a festival is held to celebrate San Francisco de Asís, patron of the town and in December there is a festival held in honor of the Virgin of Guadalupe.

Climate

The climate in  Zontecomatlán  is warm-humid with an average temperature of 18°C, with rains in summer and autumn.

References

External links 

  Municipal Official webpage

Municipalities of Veracruz